Shahrak-e Esteqlal (also Romanized as Shahrak-e Esteqlāl; also known as Esteqlāl) is a village in Dasht-e Abbas Rural District, Musian District, Dehloran County, Ilam Province, Iran. At the 2006 census, its population was 459, in 79 families.

References 

Populated places in Dehloran County